Lenzy Ramon Pipkins (born November 7, 1993) is an American football cornerback who is currently a free agent. He played college football at Louisiana–Monroe and Oklahoma State. He was signed by the Green Bay Packers as an undrafted free agent in 2017.

Early years
Pipkins played high school football at Mansfield High School in Mansfield, Texas, when he recorded 52 tackles, 7 pass breakups, and 1 interception his senior year. That was his only season of high school football. He had previously not played football since the eighth grade. He lettered one season in football, three seasons in basketball and three seasons in track at Mansfield High.

College career
Pipkins played for the Louisiana–Monroe Warhawks of the University of Louisiana at Monroe from 2013 to 2015. He was redshirted in 2012. He played in all 12 games, starting 3, in 2013, recording 12 solo tackles, 12 tackle assists, 1 interception and 3 pass breakups. Pipkins played in 9 games, all starts, in 2014, recording 24 solo tackles, 8 tackle assists, 1 sack, 1 interception and 2 pass breakups while also missing 3 games due to injury. He played in all 13 games, starting 10, in 2015, recording 34 solo tackles, 14 tackle assists, 1 sack, 2 pass breakups and 1 forced fumble. He graduated from Louisiana–Monroe after the 2015 season. Pipkins transferred to play for the Oklahoma State Cowboys of Oklahoma State University in 2016. He played in all 13 games in 2016, recording 24 solo tackles, 14 tackle assists, 1 interception and 2 pass breakups. He played in 47 games, starting 22, during his college career, recording 94 solo tackles, 48 tackle assists and 3 interceptions.

College statistics

Professional career
Pipkins was rated the 69th best cornerback in the 2017 NFL Draft by NFLDraftScout.com.

Green Bay Packers
After going undrafted, Pipkins signed with the Green Bay Packers on May 5, 2017. In Week 6 of the 2017 season against the Minnesota Vikings, Pipkins recorded his first six career tackles.

Indianapolis Colts
Pipkins was traded to the Indianapolis Colts on August 26, 2018 in exchange for linebacker Antonio Morrison. He was waived on September 2, 2018 and was re-signed to the practice squad two days later. He was promoted to the active roster on September 11, 2018. He was waived again on September 22, 2018 and re-signed back to the practice squad. He was promoted back to the active roster on October 4, 2018. He was waived again on October 9, 2018.

Detroit Lions
On October 10, 2018, Pipkins was claimed off waivers by the Detroit Lions. He was waived on November 12, 2018.

Cleveland Browns
On November 19, 2018, Pipkins was signed to the Cleveland Browns practice squad. The Browns signed Pipkins to a futures contract on January 2, 2019. Pipkins was waived by the Browns on August 31, 2019.

New England Patriots
On February 11, 2020, Pipkins was signed by the New England Patriots. On July 25, 2020, the Patriots released Pipkins before training camp opened.

NFL career statistics

Regular season

Personal life
Pipkins's cousin, C. J. Wilson, also played football in the NFL.

References

External links
Green Bay Packers bio
Louisiana–Monroe Warhawks bio
Oklahoma State Cowboys bio

Living people
1993 births
People from Mansfield, Texas
Players of American football from Texas
Sportspeople from Arlington, Texas
American football cornerbacks
Louisiana–Monroe Warhawks football players
Oklahoma State Cowboys football players
Green Bay Packers players
Indianapolis Colts players
Detroit Lions players
Cleveland Browns players
New England Patriots players